The South African Railways Class 31-000 of 1958 was a diesel-electric locomotive.

In June and July 1958, the South African Railways placed forty-five Class  General Electric type U12B diesel-electric locomotives in service. They were later reclassified to Class  and renumbered.

Manufacturer
The South African Class 31-000 type GE U12B diesel-electric locomotive was designed for the South African Railways (SAR) and built by General Electric in 1958. They were the first diesel-electric road locomotives to enter SAR service in quantity.

Reclassification and renumbering
Upon delivery, they were designated Class 1-DE and numbered in the range from D700 to D744 in the non-steam locomotive number range which had hitherto been used almost exclusively for electric locomotives, the exceptions being the pre-war experimental Class DS and Class DS1 diesel-electric locomotives.

Orientation
The Class 31-000 was a high short hood locomotive. While the short hood end was usually considered as the front end, the cab was equipped with dual station controls to make it fully bidirectional.

Service
They were placed in service at Germiston. One of their first duties was to take over the shunt duties at Milner Park from where complaints had been received from the tennis players at the club about the cinders being deposited on the all-weather courts. When originally ordered, it had been the intention to use them on shunting and block-load transfers on the Reef and as part of the program to eliminate steam traction from the new Johannesburg station, but their success in this service prompted a change in utilisation policy. In 1959 they were placed in mainline service working out of Johannesburg to Kroonstad and Bloemfontein in the Free State and to Volksrust on the mainline to Natal. They were very successful on mainline work and showed their ability to handle anything from goods workings to fast passenger trains like the Trans-Natal. They usually worked in pairs and longer lash-ups of up to four units were rarely seen.

The Class 31-000 had a huge impact on SAR motive power. In terms of speed and acceleration, they were superb and it didn't take long for the diesels to become a common sight on mainline working. Their unqualified success played a large part in the eventual demise of SAR steam traction.

By 1969 they were also used in goods working on the line from Krugersdorp via Magaliesburg  and Swartruggens to Zeerust. By the 1980s they were finally relegated to the shunting and pickup service that they were originally intended for when new, working on the Reef and at some other major centres.

Withdrawal
Of the original forty-five locomotives, forty survived into the Spoornet era in the 1990s. Now retired from Spoornet service, some still see service in private hands. Three of them, numbers 31-001 (D700), 31-005 (D704) and 31-038 (D737), were acquired by Sheltam for use at Rand Uranium near Randfontein and at Welkom. The first two were converted to low short hood locomotives and were still in service in 2014, while the third was used for spare parts.

Another private rail operator, RRL Grindrod, owns no. 31-009 (D708) as its no. , which was still employed at Welkom in 2014.

Preservation
As of 2015, no. D706 (31-007) has been staged at Bloemfontein Locomotive Depot where a Locomotive Museum is being created to restore it and some other historically significant units, while no. D727 (31-028) is preserved at Bellville Loco Depot.

Liveries
The locomotives were delivered in a livery that displayed the colours of the South African flag, white on the upper half and blue on the lower half, separated by an orange stripe on the sides and orange whiskers on the ends. They had black running boards, red buffer beams and black cowcatchers. From 1960 this livery gradually began to be replaced by Gulf Red with yellow stripes.

Works numbers
The Class 31-000 builder's works numbers, renumbering and known disposition are listed in the table.

Illustration

References

External links

Cape gauge railway locomotives
Bo-Bo locomotives
3290
General Electric locomotives
Railway locomotives introduced in 1958
1958 in South Africa